Amanita aprica, also known as the sunshine amanita, is a species of fungus in the family Amanitaceae. Described as new to science in 2005, the species is found in the Pacific Northwest region of North America, where it grows in a mycorrhizal association with Douglas-fir and pines.

The species has a yellow to orange cap with warty remnants of the whitish universal veil. The gills are pale, as is the stipe, which may be wider at the base. A skirt-like ring may be present, especially on younger specimens.

See also

List of Amanita species

References

External links

Amanita aprica at mushroomexpert.com
Amanita aprica at amanitaceae.org

aprica
Fungi of Canada
Fungi of the United States
Fungi described in 2005